Fortune Akpan Bassey (born 6 October 1998) is a Nigerian professional footballer who plays as a striker for Swedish club Degerfors on loan from the Hungarian club Ferencváros.

Club career
Bassey is a youth product of the Nigerian academy Eagle's Wing and the Czech club Bohemians 1905. He began his senior career in the Czech Republic in the third division with Olympia Radotín, scoring 24 goals in 33 games. He then had a stint with Czech National Football League side Ústí nad Labem in 2019-20, before moving to the first division with České Budějovice. 

On 17 January 2022, Bassey moved to the Hungarian side Ferencváros in a record sale from České Budějovice. He finished his debut season in Hungary with 5 goals in 23 matches in all competitions. In his debut season with Ferencváros he won the Nemzeti Bajnokság I and Magyar Kupa. He returned to the Czech Republic on a loan with Viktoria Plzeň on 12 April 2022. After half year Bassey returned back to Ferencváros.

On 4 March 2023, Bassey moved on a new loan to Degerfors in Sweden until the end of 2023.

Honours
Ferencváros
 Nemzeti Bajnokság I: 2021–22
 Magyar Kupa: 2021–22

References

External links
 
 HLSZ Profile
 

1998 births
Sportspeople from Benin City
Living people
Nigerian footballers
Association football forwards
FK Ústí nad Labem players
SK Dynamo České Budějovice players
FC Sellier & Bellot Vlašim players
Ferencvárosi TC footballers
FC Viktoria Plzeň players
Degerfors IF players
Czech First League players
Czech National Football League players
Nemzeti Bajnokság I players
Nigerian expatriate footballers
Expatriate footballers in the Czech Republic
Nigerian expatriate sportspeople in the Czech Republic
Expatriate footballers in Hungary
Nigerian expatriate sportspeople in Hungary
Expatriate footballers in Sweden
Nigerian expatriate sportspeople in Sweden